Peale's free-tailed bat (Nyctinomops aurispinosus) is a bat species from South and Central America.

References

Molossidae
Mammals of Colombia
Bats of Mexico
Bats of South America
Taxa named by Titian Peale